José Fuentes Mares National Prize for Literature (Spanish: Premio Nacional de Literatura José Fuentes Mares or simply Premio José Fuentes Mares) is a Mexican literary award that has been presented annually since 1985 by the Universidad Autónoma de Ciudad Juárez. It is given to a Mexican author who has published a book in the form of short stories, poems or a novel. The award is named in honor of José Fuentes Mares.

The first recipient was the writer Jesús Gardea, who declined the prize. Some well-known authors who have won it include Daniel Sada, Carlos Montemayor, Jaime Labastida, Alberto Ruy Sánchez, Juan Villoro, José Emilio Pacheco and Hernan Lara Zavala.

Winners
Sources for 1986–2011:
1986 Jesús Gardea (rejected by Gardes)
1987 Jaime Labastida and Sergio Galindo
1988 Eugenio Aguirre
1989 Alberto Blanco, Song to the Shadow of the Animals
1990 Carlos Montemayor
1991 Alberto Ruy Sánchez, Una introducción a Octavio Paz
1992 Bruno Estañol
1993 Javier Sicilia, El Bautista
1994 Julio Eutiquio Sarabia
1995 Hernán Lara Zavala
1996 Ignacio Solares
1997 Angelina Muñiz–Hubermann
1998 Héctor Manjarrez
1999 Daniel Sada
2000 José Emilio Pacheco, La arena errante
2001 Mario González Suárez, El libro de las pasiones
2002 Élmer Mendoza, El amante de Janis Joplin 
2003 Enrique Servín, El agua y la sombra
2004 Enrique Mijares, Espinazo del diablo
2005 David Toscana, El último lector
2006 Federico Patán, Encuentros
2007 Norma Lazo, El dolor es un triángulo equilátero
2008 Tedi López Mills, Contracorriente
2009 Edgar Chías Orozco, De insomnio y medianoche
2009 Edeberto Galindo Noriega, Río ánimas
2010 Ricardo García Mainou, Cuando te toca
2011 Mauricio Carrera, La derrota de los días
2012
2013
2014 Eduardo Antonio Parra, Desterrados
2015 Imanol Caneyada, Hotel de Arraigo
2016 Antonio Zúñiga. Juárez Jerusalem and Mi papá no es santo ni enmascarado de teatro and Matatena

References

External links

Mexican literary awards
Awards established in 1985
Fiction awards
Poetry awards
Short story awards
1985 establishments in Mexico